= Stephen Neel =

English politician

Stephen Neel (fl. 1400–1433) was an English politician. He sat as MP for Cambridge in May 1413.

He also served as bailiff of Cambridge from September 1407 till 1410, 1414 till 1417, 1423 till 1424, 1428 till 1429, and 1432 till 1433.
